NAMA (noncoding RNA associated with MAP kinase pathway and growth arrest) is a long non-coding RNA gene. It is induced by cell growth arrest, apoptosis, and inhibition of the MAP kinase pathway.

See also
 Long noncoding RNA

References

Non-coding RNA